Almamy Doumbia (born 25 October 1983) is a retired Ivorian footballer who played as a left midfielder.

Doumbia was born in Daloa. He joined Bari in join-ownership bid in January 2009. He played the first and only match for Bari on 17 January against bottom team Treviso. In June 2009 he was bought back by Andria.

References

External links

1983 births
Living people
People from Daloa
Association football midfielders
Ivorian footballers
Ivorian expatriate footballers
Ivory Coast under-20 international footballers
Ivory Coast international footballers
Serie B players
A.C. Perugia Calcio players
Catania S.S.D. players
A.S. Sambenedettese players
Ivorian expatriate sportspeople in Italy
S.S. Fidelis Andria 1928 players
S.S.C. Bari players
A.S.D. Martina Calcio 1947 players
A.S. Melfi players
A.S. Bisceglie Calcio 1913 players
Expatriate footballers in Italy